Lake Kuchuk or Kuchukskoye is a bittern salt lake in the southern part of the West Siberian Plain, Blagoveshchensky District, Altai Krai, south-central Russia.

Its waters are briny, containing sodium sulphate. The northern end of the lake is connected by a channel with Lake Kulunda to the north.

Geography
Lake Kuchuk is the second largest lake in Altai Krai. The Kuchuk river flows into the eastern shore of the lake.

See also
list of lakes of Russia

References

External links
 Company — Kuchuksulphate
 Biochemichal Composition of Artemia Cysts Used as Food for Juvenile Fish from Different Hypersaline Lakes of the Altai Territory

Kuchuk
Endorheic lakes of Asia
West Siberian Plain